Gulnara Vygovskaya (born 6 September 1980) is a Russian long-distance runner who specializes in marathon races.

She finished twelfth at the 2006 World Road Running Championships, helping the Russian team take a fifth place in the team competition.

Her personal best time in the half marathon is 1:12:06 hours, achieved in September 2006 in Saransk. In the marathon she has 2:32:51 hours, achieved in October 2006 in Frankfurt.

International competitions

References

1980 births
Living people
Russian female long-distance runners
Russian female marathon runners
World Athletics Championships athletes for Russia
Russian Athletics Championships winners
20th-century Russian women
21st-century Russian women